Taegeuk is a Korean term cognate with the Chinese term Taiji (Wade-Giles spelling: T'ai-chi), meaning "supreme ultimate", although it can also be translated as "great polarity / duality". The symbol was chosen for the design of the Korean national flag in the 1880s, swapping out the black and white color scheme often seen in most taijitu illustrations and substituting blue and red, respectively, along with a horizontal separator, as opposed to vertical.

This particular color-themed taegeuk symbol (i.e. using blue and red) is typically associated with Korean tradition and represents balance in the universe; the red half represents positive cosmic forces, and the blue half represents the complementary or opposing, negative cosmic forces. It is also used in Korean shamanism, Confucianism, Taoism and Buddhism.

History
The Taegeuk diagram has been existent for the majority of written Korean history. The origins of the interlocking-sinusoid design in Korea can be traced to as early as the Goguryeo or Silla period, e.g. in the decoration of a sword, dated to the 5th or 6th century, recovered from the grave of Michu of Silla, or an artifact with the taegeuk pattern of similar age found in the Bogam-ri tombs of Baekje at Naju, South Jeolla Province in 2008. In the compound of Gameunsa, a temple built in AD 628 during the reign of King Jinpyeong of Silla, a stone object, perhaps the foundation of a pagoda, is carved with the taegeuk design.

In Gojoseon, the ancient kingdom of Joseon, the design was used to express the hope for harmony of yin and yang. It is likely due to the earliest spread of ancient Chinese culture in Gojoseon, especially during the early Zhou dynasty.

Today the TaeGeuk is usually associated with Korean tradition and represents balance in the universe, as mentioned in the previous section (red = 양; yang, or positive cosmic forces, and  blue = 음; yin, or negative cosmic forces). Among its many religious connotations (Korean Confucianism; Taoism in Korea; Korean Buddhism), the taeguk is also present in Korean shamanism.

South Korean flag

The Taegeuk symbol is most prominently displayed in the center of South Korea's national flag, called the taegeukgi, literally  taegeuk flag.(along with four of the eight trigrams used in divination). Because of the Taegeuk's association with the national flag, it is often used as a patriotic symbol, as are the colors red, blue, and black.

While the use of the taeguk and the trigrams have been used since the earliest periods of Korean history, its history goes back even further in China.

The Taegeuk is a Confucian icon which symbolizes cosmic balance, and represents the constant interaction between the yin and yang, also known as eum/yang in Korean (음양 | 陰陽). The taegeuk symbol used on the flag originated from the Chinese Confucian classic known as The Book of Changes (also known as I Ching or Yijing), a book developed for use in divination.

The four trigrams also originated from the I Ching; each of these trigrams represent specific Confucian virtues, cosmic elements, or family roles, in addition to seasons, compass directions, etc. The 건 "geon" trigram (☰) represents the heaven (sky), summer, south, father, and justice. The 곤 "gon" trigram (☷) symbolizes the earth (ground), winter, north, mother, and vitality, the 감 "gam" trigram (☵) the moon, autumn, west, 2nd (or middle) son, and wisdom, and the 리 "ri" trigram (☲) the sun, spring, east, 2nd (or middle) daughter, and fruition. The four trigrams supposedly move in an endless cycle from "geon" to "ri" to "gon" to "gam" and back to "geon" in their pursuit of perfection.

The white background symbolizes the homogeneity, integrity and purity of the Korean people. Traditionally, Koreans often wore white clothing, earning the nickname "white-clothed people" and therefore the colour white epitomizes the Korean people.

Variants

Tricolored taegeuk

A variant in South Korea is the tricolored taegeuk (sam·saeg·ui tae·geuk  or sam·tae·geuk ), which adds a yellow lobe or "pa". The yellow portion is taken as representing humanity, in addition to the red and blue representing earth and heaven,  respectively.

A rendition of the tricolored TaeGeuk also appeared in the official logo of the 1988 Summer Olympics accompanied by the five Olympic rings.

Paralympics symbol

The first designated Paralympic logo, created for the 1988 Summer Paralympics in Seoul, was based on the traditional pa, the spiral or sinusoid components making up the Taegeuk symbol. In March 1992, the Paralympic symbol was changed to a version utilizing only three pa. This was not fully adopted until after the 1994 Winter Paralympics in Lillehammer, Norway, since the Lillehammer Paralympic Organizing Committee had by then already started a marketing program based on the five-pa version. The three-pa version remained in place from the close of the Lillehammer Games through the 2004 Summer Paralympics in Athens, Greece. The current Paralympic symbol has morphed the teardrop-shaped pa into more of a swoosh (similar to the Nike logo), but still employs three such colour swatches, one each of red, blue, and green.

Gallery

See also
 Culture of Korea
 Gankyil
 Korean philosophy
 Taegeuk (taekwondo)
 Taekwondo
 Taiji (philosophy)
 Taijitu
 Tomoe
 Yin and Yang

References

External links

 Taegeuk at Naver 

Korean culture
National symbols of Korea
National symbols of South Korea
Tao
Visual motifs
Korean heraldry